Martha Palamarek Bielish (October 20, 1915 – May 18, 2010) was a politician, farmer, feminist, and teacher from Alberta, Canada. She served in the Senate of Canada as a member of the Progressive Conservative caucus from 1979 to 1990.

Early life
Bielish was born in 1915 in Smoky Lake, Alberta. She served in politics on the municipal level as an elected School Trustee.

Bielish ran for a seat to the Legislative Assembly of Alberta in the 1959 Alberta general election as a Progressive Conservative candidate in the electoral district of Redwater. She finished a distant third place in the three-way race behind Social Credit candidate John Dubetz and incumbent MLA Alfred Macyk.

In 1965 she became president of the Alberta's Women's Institute.

Senate career
Bielish was appointed to the Senate of Canada on the advice of Joe Clark on September 27, 1979 and served until mandatory retirement on September 26, 1990. She was the first Ukrainian-Canadian woman to sit in the Senate.

References

External links
Martha Bielish appointed to the Senate Smoky Lake Signal, October 3, 1979, Volume 2, Number 22
 

1915 births
2010 deaths
Women members of the Senate of Canada
Canadian senators from Alberta
Progressive Conservative Party of Canada senators
Canadian feminists
Progressive Conservative Association of Alberta candidates in Alberta provincial elections
Women in Alberta politics
Canadian people of Ukrainian descent